Tanema (Tetawo, Tetau) is a nearly extinct language of the island of Vanikoro, in the easternmost province of the Solomon Islands.

Vitality

As of 2012, Tanema is only spoken by one speaker, Lainol Nalo. It has been replaced by Teanu, the main language of Vanikoro.

The language

Notes

References

 —— (2021). Online Teanu–English dictionary, with lexical data in Lovono and Tanema. Paris, CNRS.

External links
Audio recordings in the Tanema language, in open access, by A. François (source: Pangloss Collection of CNRS).

Languages of the Solomon Islands
Temotu languages
Endangered Austronesian languages
Critically endangered languages